Aacanthocnema luehmannii is a species of jumping plant louse, first found on plants of the genus Allocasuarina in Australia. The species is characterised by exhibiting an elongate habitus; short Rs and short cubital forewing cells; ventral genal processes beneath the apical margin of its vertex; short antennae; and nymphs that are elongate and very sclerotised (scale-like). It lacks hinaria on its eighth antennal segment as well as sclerotised spurs on its hind tibia. Females of the species lack a posterior apical hook on their proctiger.

References

Triozidae
Insects described in 2011